Bichhiya Assembly constituency is one of the 230 Vidhan Sabha (Legislative Assembly) constituencies of Madhya Pradesh state in central India.

It is part of Mandla District.

Members of Legislative Assembly
Baredi Budana - 1957 (INC)
Shankerlal - 1962 (RRP)
Darbari Singh - 1967 (INC)
Darbari Singh - 1972 (INC)
Mangilal - 1977 (JNP)
Manik Lal Pareti - 1980 (INC(I))
Manik Lal Pareti - 1985 (INC)
Roop Singh - 1990 (BJP)
Jhallu Ram Takam - 1993 (BJP)
Tulsiram Dhumketi - 1998 (INC)
Pandit Singh Dhurwey - 2003 (BJP)
Narayan Singh Patta - 2008 (INC)
Pandit Singh Dhurwey - 2013 (BJP)

See also
Bichhiya

References

Assembly constituencies of Madhya Pradesh